Felix Headlam (20 June 1897 – 5 October 1965) was an Australian cricketer. He played two first-class matches for Tasmania between 1913 and 1915.

See also
 List of Tasmanian representative cricketers

References

External links
 

1897 births
1965 deaths
Australian cricketers
Tasmania cricketers
Cricketers from Tasmania